The Tyniec Sacramentarium is an Ottonian illuminated manuscript  written in ca. 1060–1070, probably near Cologne.
A Sacramentary gives the priest's readings and prayers for the Mass.

It is one of the oldest surviving codices in Poland, where it first arrived during the Middle Ages.  Magnificently decorated, it is one of the most precious artefacts of the Ottonian manuscript painting school.

Christian illuminated manuscripts